Loyola Institute of Business Administration (LIBA) is a private business school in Chennai, Tamil Nadu, India, was founded by the Society of Jesus (Jesuits) in 1979. It is situated on the Loyola College, Chennai, campus and run by the Loyola College Society.

History 
Loyola Institute of Business Administration (LIBA) when established in 1979 had a three-year, part-time PGDBM program catering to the needs of business executives in and around Chennai. This program was approved by the All India Council for Technical Education (AICTE). Since 1995 LIBA has offered a two-year, full-time PGDM program, approved by the AICTE and recognized as equivalent to an MBA degree by the Association of Indian Universities (AIU). LIBA also offers a full-time MBA (PGDM) program (2 years), part-time MBA (PGBM) program (3 years), various executive diploma courses, and certificate programs in various management subjects. It is a resource center for doctoral programs offered in affiliation with the University of Madras.

Rankings

Loyola Institute of Business Administration was ranked 50 by the National Institutional Ranking Framework (NIRF) management ranking in 2020.

Centres of excellence 
 Centre for Ethics and Governance
 Centre for Retail and Supply Chain Management
 Prof. C.K. Prahalad Centre for Emerging India

See also
 List of Jesuit sites

References

External links
 

Business schools in Chennai
Colleges affiliated to University of Madras
Jesuit universities and colleges in India
Educational institutions established in 1979
1979 establishments in Tamil Nadu